The Leipzig Debate was a theological disputation originally between Andreas Karlstadt, Martin Luther  and Johann Eck. Karlstadt, the dean of the Wittenberg theological faculty, felt that he had to defend Luther against Eck's critical commentary on the 95 Theses and so challenged Johann Eck, a professor of theology at the University of Ingolstadt, to a public debate concerning the doctrines of free will and grace. The Leipzig Debate took place in June and July 1519 at Pleissenburg Castle in Leipzig, Germany. Its purpose was to discuss Martin Luther's teachings and was initiated and conducted in the presence of George, Duke of Saxony, an opponent of Luther. Eck, considered the master debater in the Holy Roman Empire, was concerned about clerical abuses, but his life's work had been dedicated to the defence of Catholic teachings and combating heresy.

Eck invited Luther to join the debate, and when Luther arrived in July, he and Eck expanded the terms of the debate to include matters such as the existence of purgatory, the sale of indulgences, the need for and methods of penance and the legitimacy of papal authority.

Also, Luther's position (also supported by Erasmus) on burning heretics was later summarized asas one of the statements specifically censured in Exsurge Domine "Haereticos comburi est contra voluntatem Spiritus" (It is contrary to the Spirit to burn heretics).

The debate led Pope Leo X to censur Luther and threaten him with excommunication from the Catholic Church in his June 1520 papal bull, Exsurge Domine, which banned Luther's views from being preached or written.

Participants

See also 

 Diet of Worms

References

1519 in Christianity
1519 in Europe
Leipzig
Leipzig
Lutheran theology
Martin Luther
Philosophy of love